

Television

2020s

2010s

2000s 

Note: Circa 2003–2005, WSBK-TV televised Friday night games in the Boston area while WBZ-TV televised the 4th of July game; these games were seen on NESN throughout the rest of New England.

1990s

1980s

1970s

1960s

1950s

1940s

Substitutes

Play-by-Play
Leo Egan (1970)
Gary Thorne (1992-1993)
Brent Musburger (1992)
Bob Montgomery (1992-1995)
Gil Santos (1992)
John Rooke (1995)
Steve Zabriskie (1996)
Doug Brown (1997-1998)
Don Orsillo (2000)
Hector Martinez (1994-2001)
Jon Rish (2010, 2014)
Eric Frede (2010-2014)
Josh Maurer (2015)
Tom Caron (2016-present)
Alex Faust (2019)
Will Flemming (2019)
Mike Monaco (2019–present)

Color Commentator
Jerry Remy (1992-1995)
Dennis Eckersley (2003–2021)
Dave Roberts (2009)
Buck Martinez (2009)
Tony Massarotti (2009)
Rance Mulliniks (2009)
Rex Hudler (2009)
Ron Coomer (2009)
Ken Rosenthal (2009)
Kevin Kennedy (2009)
Dwight Evans (2009)
Sean Casey (2009)
Jim Kaat (2009)
Gordon Edes (2009)
Bob Montgomery (2009)
Frank Viola (2009)
Sean McAdam (2009)
Brian Daubach (2009)
Rick Dempsey (2010-2012)
Gregg Zaun (2011)
Roy Smalley III (2012)
Peter Abraham (2012)
Nick Cafardo (2012–2013)
Peter Gammons (2012–2013)
Jim Rice (2013)
Rob Bradford (2013)
Jon Rish (2013–2014)
Derek Lowe (2013)
Jonny Gomes (2017–2018)
Mike Timlin (2017)
Wade Boggs (2017)
Jarrod Saltalamacchia (2017)
Lenny DiNardo (2017)
Todd Walker (2017, 2019)
John Valentin (2017)
Carlos Peña (2017)
Ellis Burks (2021–present)
Lenny DiNardo (2021)

Field Reporter
Kathryn Tappen (2006-2011)
Jade McCarthy (2010-2011)
Tony Lee (2011)
Jamie Erdahl (2013–2014)
Jahmai Webster (2017)
Tom Caron (2017;2019)

Studio Host
Butch Stearns (1997-1998)
Kathryn Tappen (2006-2011)
Adam Pellerin (2013–present)

Studio Analyst
Brian Daubach (2009)
Tony Massarotti (2009)
Gordon Edes (2009)
Nick Cafardo (2009–present)
Ken Ryan (2009)
Lenny DiNardo (2017–present)
Jonny Gomes (2017–present)
Jarrod Saltalamacchia (2017)
Todd Walker (2017)
John Valentin (2017)
Manny Delcarmen (2018)

Radio

2020s

2010s

2000s

1990s

1980s

1970s

1960s

1950s

1940s

1930s

1920s

Substitutes

Play-by-Play
Spike Brown (1970)

Spanish Radio

2020s

2010s

2000s

1990s

See also 
 List of current Major League Baseball announcers
 Red Sox Radio Network
 List of Boston Bruins broadcasters
 List of Boston Celtics broadcasters
 List of New England Revolution broadcasters
 List of New England Patriots broadcasters

Notes
During the 2013 season, Jerry Remy took a leave of absence after his son, Jared Remy, was arrested for murder.
Red Sox color commentator Jerry Remy was off the air indefinitely during the 2009 season while he recovered from complications of cancer. NESN used guest analysts in his absence. Dennis Eckersley did the majority of home games and Dave Roberts did most of the road games. 
 In 2000, Bob Rodgers replaced Bob Kurtz when he left to cover the Minnesota Wild. Tom Caron replaced Rodgers as studio host.
 From 1990 to 2004, Sean McDonough missed Red Sox games while covering events for CBS Sports and ESPN, making it necessary for the channel he was working for to hire a second announcer to serve as a fill-in. For games when Bob Montgomery served as the play by play announcer, NESN analyst Jerry Remy would serve as color commentator.
 Dave O'Brien misses Red Sox games due to his work on ESPN.
 Dave Martin joined the Red Sox radio broadcast crew in June 1972 when John MacLean left due to illness
 In 1970, announcers Ken Coleman, Ned Martin, and Johnny Pesky refused to cross the picket line of WHDH-TV's electrical workers. During the strike, Leo Egan called games on television and Spike Brown handled the radio broadcasts.
 Don Gillis filled in most for most of the 1957 season while Curt Gowdy was out with a bad back.
 The only game broadcast in 1926 was opening day
 Bill Kulik was only a part-time broadcaster
 Juan Oscar Baez joined Spanish radio crew in June after J.P. Villaman's death
 On July 25, 2008, WTTT swapped call signs with sister station WWDJ in Hackensack, New Jersey
 Jon Rish resigned during the 2013 season. He was replaced by Sean Grande and Lou Merloni

References

 
Boston Red Sox
Boston Red Sox broadcasters
broadcasters